Nicolas-Joseph Beaurepaire (7 January 1740, in Coulommiers, Seine-et-Marne – 2 September 1792) was a French officer.

Born in Coulommiers, he commanded the defense of Verdun against the invading Allied armies of the First Coalition, shortly before they were stopped at the Battle of Valmy. He chose death by suicide to avoid the dishonor of surrendering Verdun.

He was buried in the Panthéon, though his body has since disappeared.

References

1740 births
1792 deaths
People from Coulommiers
French military personnel of the French Revolutionary Wars
French military personnel who committed suicide
Burials at the Panthéon, Paris
Names inscribed under the Arc de Triomphe